Protium connarifolium is a species of plant in the Burseraceae family. It is found in Malaysia and the Philippines.

References

connarifolium
Vulnerable plants
Taxonomy articles created by Polbot